Jasmine Armfield (born 17 December 1998) is an English actress, known for portraying the role of Bex Fowler in the BBC soap opera EastEnders from 2014 to 2020.

Early life
Armfield was born in Southend, Essex. She attended The King John School in South Benfleet, Essex and became a student at the Wickford's Pauline Quirke Academy for the Performing Arts when it opened in September 2010.

Career
In 2014, Armfield was cast in the BBC soap opera EastEnders as Bex Fowler, making her first appearance on 15 January 2014. Her storylines on EastEnders included her relationship with Shakil Kazemi (Shaheen Jafargholi), being bullied, losing her virginity, dealing with the grief of Shakil being murdered, getting into the University of Oxford and attempting suicide. In 2017, she was nominated for Best Soap Actress at the TV Choice Awards. She departed on 6 March 2020. In May 2021, she appeared in an episode of the BBC soap opera Doctors as Layla Roberts. Then in June 2022, Armfield appeared in an episode of the BBC medical drama series Casualty.

Filmography

References

External links
 

1998 births
Living people
Actresses from Essex
English television actresses
English soap opera actresses
English child actresses
People from Southend-on-Sea